Jack Wratten (30 July 1906 – 24 August 1996) was a Progressive Conservative party
member of the House of Commons of Canada. He was born in England and became a contractor by career.

He was first elected at the Brantford riding in the 1957 general election and served two terms until his defeat in the 1962 election.

During his second term in the House of Commons in 1961, Wratten attempted to establish a national holiday in honour of Canada's first Prime Minister by supporting a parliamentary bill. Had this become law, John A. Macdonald Day would have been observed each year on a Monday in mid-February. Macdonald's birthdate in January was deemed too soon after the Christmas and New Year's holiday period for this purpose.

References

External links
 
 Jack Wratten at LiPaD

1906 births
1996 deaths
Members of the House of Commons of Canada from Ontario
Progressive Conservative Party of Canada MPs
British emigrants to Canada